CF Pozuelo de Alarcón Femenino is the women's football team of CF Pozuelo de Alarcón, currently playing in Spain's second level, Segunda División.

History
Founded in 1995, Pozuelo was a founding member of the unified Superliga Femenina in 2001. After spending four seasons in the bottom half of the table, it was relegated in 2005. The team was back in top-flight for the 2008–09 season, but could not avoid relegation.

Season by season

Former internationals
 : Milene Domingues
 : Adriana Martín, Silvia Zarza, Estela Fernández, Sonia Bermúdez,  Claudia Zornoza, Alba Mellado,  Alicia Gómez, Sonia Prim
 : Zineb Rechiche

References

Women's football clubs in Spain
Association football clubs established in 1995
1995 establishments in Spain
Football clubs in the Community of Madrid
Segunda Federación (women) clubs
Primera División (women) clubs